Christopher Bolt CB is a British economist and, formerly non-executive chairman of the Office of Rail Regulation, the national economic and safety regulatory authority for Britain's railways, and (separately) the arbiter for the London Underground public-private partnership.

Background 
Christopher Bolt born 1953 in Plymouth, Devon.

Railways 
In 1994, Bolt moved to the Office of the Rail Regulator to take up appointment as chief economist. After Deputy Prime Minister John Prescott MP decided not to reappoint John Swift QC as Rail Regulator, Bolt was given a seven-month contract as Rail Regulator pending Prescott's decision on the full-term appointment of Tom Winsor from 5 July 1999.

In July 1999, Bolt left the Office of the Rail Regulator and joined Transco plc, the company which owns and operates the majority of Great Britain's gas transportation system, as regulation and corporate affairs director. He was appointed to a new role of group director, regulation and public policy in Transco's parent company, Lattice Group plc, in November 2001. He left Lattice in October 2002 on completion of its merger with National Grid Group plc.

From 5 July 2004, Bolt became chairman of the Office of Rail Regulation, until succeeded by Anna Walker in July 2009.

London Underground arbiter 
In December 2002 Bolt was appointed Arbiter for the public-private partnership for the London Underground.

The role of PPP Arbiter was established by the Greater London Authority Act 1999 (GLA Act). The Secretary of State for Transport appointed Chris Bolt as the first PPP Arbiter for a four-year term from 31 December 2002, the date of commencement of the Tube Lines contract. This term was extended on 18 May 2006 for a further four years to December 2010.

Bolt was appointed Companion of the Order of the Bath (CB) in the 2010 New Year Honours.

References

External links
Chris Bolt is to step down as chairman of the Office of Rail Regulation for July 2009
Streetmetluser1youtube.com

Members of HM Government Economic Service
People working in public safety
Civil servants in HM Treasury
Civil servants in the Home Office
Civil servants in the Department of the Environment
Year of birth missing (living people)
Living people
Companions of the Order of the Bath